Peroxydisulfuric acid is an inorganic compound with a chemical formula . Also called Marshall's acid after Professor Hugh Marshall, who discovered it in 1891.

Structure and bonding
This oxoacid features sulfur in its +6 oxidation state and a peroxide group. Sulfur adopts the usual tetrahedral geometry.

Synthesis 
The acid is prepared by the reaction of chlorosulfuric acid with hydrogen peroxide:
2ClSO3H + H2O2 → H2S2O8 + 2 HCl

Another method is the electrolysis of moderately concentrated sulfuric acid (60-70%) with platinum electrodes at high current density and voltage:

H2SO4 + H2O → H3O+ + HSO4− (dissociation of sulfuric acid)
2HSO4− → H2S2O8 + 2e− (E0 = +2.4V) (bisulfate oxidation)
2H2SO4 → H2S2O8 + H2 (overall reaction)
3H2O → O3 + 6H+ (ozone produced as a side product)

Uses
Peroxydisulfuric acid is a precursor to several salts including sodium peroxydisulfate, potassium peroxydisulfate, and ammonium peroxydisulfate. These salts are used to initiate the polymerization of acrylonitrile, styrene, and related monomers. This application exploits the tendency of the peroxydisulfate anion to undergo homolysis to produce radicals. They are also used as cleaning of circuit boards.

See also
 Peroxymonosulfuric acid (Caro's acid)
 Piranha solution

References

Hydrogen compounds
Peroxy acids
Persulfates
Sulfur oxoacids